One-Hand Clapping is a 2001 Danish comedy film written and directed by Gert Fredholm, and starring Jens Okking, Peter Gantzler, and . The film was produced by Zentropa.

Plot
Erik Svensson is a wealthy but aging businessman whose wife has finally died after years of serious illness.. He is now able to sell his company and plans a life in luxury in Spain with his beautiful girlfriend Helene. Just before departure, he receives a letter from a former mistress claiming that he is the father of her daughter. He hires the undertaker Anders as his chauffeur and together they set out to investigate the claim.

Cast
 Jens Okking as Svensson
 Peter Gantzler as Anders
  as Heidi
  as Lotte
 Ann Eleonora Jørgensen as Helene
 Jesper Christensen as H.C. Krøyer
  as Elisabeth

Accolades
The film was nominated both for a Bodil and Robert award for Best Danish Film, and Jens Okking won the Bodil Award for Best Actor in a Leading Role for his performance.

References

External links
 
 

2001 films
2001 comedy films
Zentropa films
Danish comedy films